Rushwick is a village and civil parish  in the Malvern Hills District in  the county of Worcestershire, England. loggers 
Situated to the west of the city of Worcester, Rushwick Parish comprises the four villages and hamlets of Broadmore Green, Crown East, Rushwick village and Upper Wick.

The Worcester to Hereford railway line passes through the village.

Rushwick village has been circumvented by the Western By-pass, reducing through traffic, making it much quieter compared with previous times. It has one pub inside the village, and one on the outskirts. An organic meat and vegetable shop can be found in the south of the village. There is also a preschool and a primary school.

Rushwick Cricket Club, with its three Worcester Cricket League teams, Sunday and Evening League sides, and Junior teams from Under-9 to Under-16 age-groups, is situated in Upper Wick, at the Alf Tolley Memorial Ground.

The south of the parish is bordered by the River Teme.

Villages in Worcestershire
Civil parishes in Worcestershire